Emilia Vesa (born 3 January 2001) is a Finnish ice hockey winger and member of the Finnish national ice hockey team, currently playing in the Naisten Liiga (NSML) with HIFK Naiset.

Playing career
As a junior player with the Finnish national under-18 team, she participated in the IIHF Women's U18 World Championships in 2017, 2018, and 2019, winning a bronze medal at the 2019 tournament.

Vesa made her senior national team debut at the 2021 IIHF Women's World Championship in Calgary, where she won a bronze medal. Several months later, she won an Olympic bronze medal in the women's ice hockey tournament at the 2022 Winter Olympics in Beijing.

Career statistics

Regular season and playoffs 
Note: The Naisten Liiga was called the Naisten SM-sarja until 2017.

International

Awards and honors

References

External links 
 
 

2001 births
Living people
Finnish ice hockey right wingers
Finnish women's ice hockey forwards
HIFK Naiset players
Ice hockey people from Helsinki
Ice hockey players at the 2022 Winter Olympics
Kiekko-Espoo Naiset players
Medalists at the 2022 Winter Olympics
Olympic bronze medalists for Finland
Olympic ice hockey players of Finland
Olympic medalists in ice hockey
Sportspeople from Uusimaa
Team Kuortane players